Zagh Marz (also Romanized as Zāgh Marz; also known as Zaghemarz) is a village in Miyan Kaleh Rural District, in the Central District of Behshahr County, Mazandaran Province, Iran.

Due to the presence of Sadra Company, Amirabad Port, Shahid Salimi Neka Power Plant, National Iranian Oil Company and Miankaleh Peninsula and Wildlife Sanctuary, This village is touristic, Economic and commercial hub of East Mazandaran and gateway to Central Asian countries and Russia and Northern Europe. In recent years, Various ethnic groups have migrated to Zaghmarz and its suburbs. However, the vast majority of zaqmarz and the Abdolmaleki Chahar Galeh area are members of the Abdolmaleki Tribe, who settled in this area uninhabited and invaded by the Turkmen nearly two centuries ago. Because of citrus, rice and watermelon, Zaghmarz is famous in Iran.

At the 2016 census, its population was 5,932, in 1,902 families.

References

External links
Amirabad Port

Lapoo Zaghmarz Wetland and abbandan

Miankaleh Peninsula

Populated places in Behshahr County